Elaine Barrett (born 10 March 1977) is a retired British Paralympic swimmer who competed in international level events. She was born with underdeveloped eyes and little enough sight to be registered as blind, and later lost her sight entirely over 1997.

Barret was inducted to the London Youth Games Hall of Fame in 2011.

References

1978 births
Living people
People from Hackney, London
Sportspeople from Bolton
Paralympic swimmers of Great Britain
Swimmers at the 1996 Summer Paralympics
Swimmers at the 2000 Summer Paralympics
Swimmers at the 2002 Commonwealth Games
Swimmers at the 2004 Summer Paralympics
Medalists at the 1996 Summer Paralympics
Medalists at the 2000 Summer Paralympics
Medalists at the 2004 Summer Paralympics
Paralympic medalists in swimming
Paralympic gold medalists for Great Britain
Paralympic silver medalists for Great Britain
Paralympic bronze medalists for Great Britain
Commonwealth Games competitors for England
British female freestyle swimmers
British female breaststroke swimmers
British female medley swimmers
S11-classified Paralympic swimmers
Medalists at the World Para Swimming Championships